The Roman Catholic Diocese of Punta Arenas (in Latin: Dioecesis Punta Arenas) is a suffragan diocese of the  Archdiocese of Puerto Montt, in Chile. Its current bishop is Mgr. Óscar Hernán Blanco Martínez, O.M.D.

History
In 1883 the Holy See established the Apostolic Prefecture of Patagonia Meridional, Tierra del Fuego e Islas Malvinas, which was entrusted to the Salesian congregation. In 1916, the prefecture was upgraded and its name changed to Apostolic Vicariate of Magallanes e Islas Malvinas, and on 17 January 1947, Pope Pius XII erected the diocese proper by means of the Bulla "Ut in amplissimo Patagoniae Chilensis territorio". In 1952, the Apostolic Prefecture of the Falkland Islands was separated from the diocese.

All the bishops of the diocese of Punta Arenas belonged to the Salesian congregation between 1916 and 2022.

Diocesan statistics
The diocese, which comprises the entire Chilean region of Magallanes (Magallanes y Antártida Chilena), covers a territory of 112,302 km². It is estimated than 79% of the inhabitants of the diocese are Catholic. This figure represents about 120,000 Catholics out of a total population of 151,000.

Punta Arenas is the southernmost diocese in the whole Roman Catholic Church and its parish Nuestra Señora del Carmen, in Puerto Williams (Navarino island), is the southernmost Catholic parish in the world.

The mother church of the diocese is the Cathedral of El Sagrado Corazón (Sacred Heart) in the city of Punta Arenas.

Bishops
Abraham Aguilera Bravo, S.D.B. † (22 December 1916 – 24 October 1924 appointed bishop of San Carlos de Ancud)
Arturo Jara Márquez, S.D.B. † (29 January 1926 – 1938 resigned)
Cándido Rada Senosiáin, S.D.B. † (13 December 1947, did not take effect)
Vladimiro Boric Crnosija, S.D.B. † (1 February 1949 – 29 August 1973 died)
Tomás Osvaldo González Morales, S.D.B. † (28 March 1974 – 4 March 2006 retired)
Bernardo Bastres Florence, S.D.B. (4 March 2006 – 22 December 2021 resigned)
Óscar Hernán Blanco Martínez, O.M.D. (13 July 2022 – present)

Other priest of this diocese who became bishop
Alejandro Goić Karmelić, appointed Auxiliary Bishop of Concepción (Santissima Concezione)

Parishes

Sagrado Corazón (Cathedral), Punta Arenas
María Auxiliadora, Punta Arenas
Cristo Obrero, Punta Arenas
San Miguel, Punta Arenas
Nuestra Señora de Fátima, Punta Arenas
María Auxiliadora, Puerto Natales
San Francisco de Sales, Puerto Porvenir (Tierra del Fuego)
Nuestra Señora del Carmen, Puerto Williams (in Navarino island)
Padre Hurtado, Cerro Sombrero

References

External links
 Website of the diocese (in Spanish, not updated)
Diocese of Punta Arenas at the www.catholic-hierarchy.org website

Punta Arenas
Punta Arenas, Roman Catholic Diocese of
Punta Arenas
Punta Arenas
Punta Arenas